Tachymeter may refer to:

Tachymeter (survey) or tacheometer, a type of theodolite used for rapid measurements of distance
Tachymeter (watch), a scale sometimes inscribed around the rim of an analogue watch

ca:Taquímetre
es:Taquímetro
fr:Tachymètre
nl:Tachymeter
ja:タキメーター
no:Tachymeter
ru:Тахиметр
sk:Tachymeter